Let 'er Buck is a 1925 American silent Western film directed by Edward Sedgwick and starring Hoot Gibson.

Plot
As described in a review in a film magazine, Bob Carson (Gibson), working on Col. Jeff McCall's (French) ranch, is admired by Jacqueline McCall (Nixon). James Ralston (Nye), her cousin, is jealous. He fakes getting shot in a duel with Bob, who flees, finally reaching Pendleton, Oregon. There Kent Crosby (Steele), foreman of Mabel Thompson's (Sedgwick) ranch, knocks him down. Mabel comes along and accuses Bob of being a coward. Bob worsts Kent in a fight and win's Mabel's admiration by riding a dangerous bronco. She asks him to ride in the rodeo for her. Col. McCall, Jacqueline, and James arrive with their famous chariot team and are astonished to see Bob. Mabel sees that Bob is in love with Jacqueline and perplexes him by proposing. Bob then learns that he was duped by James in the duel. Kent and James kidnap Bob, but he escapes just as the chariot race is about to start. He drives Mabel's team and beats the Colonel's entry. Mabel sees that her love is not being returned and leaves when Bob and Jacqueline embrace.

Cast

Production
Let 'er Buck was filmed near Pendleton, Oregon, and contains footage from the 1924 Pendleton Round-Up.

Preservation
With no prints of Let 'er Buck located in any film archives, it is a lost film.

See also
 Hoot Gibson filmography

References

External links

 
 
 Stills at silenthollywood.com

1925 films
Lost Western (genre) films
Films directed by Edward Sedgwick
Universal Pictures films
1925 Western (genre) films
Lost American films
American black-and-white films
1925 lost films
Silent American Western (genre) films
1920s American films